Martina Hingis defeated Monica Seles in the final, 6–7(5–7), 6–4, 6–4 to win the singles tennis title at the 2000 WTA Tour Championships. It was her second Tour Finals singles title.

Lindsay Davenport was the defending champion, but lost in the first round to Elena Dementieva.

Seeds

Notes:
  Venus Williams had qualified but pulled out due to anemia
  Serena Williams had qualified but pulled out due to left foot injury
  Mary Pierce had qualified but pulled out due to right hand injury
  Amélie Mauresmo had qualified but pulled out due to left leg injury
  Anke Huber had qualified but pulled out due to right wrist injury

Draw

Finals

See also
WTA Tour Championships appearances

References

Singles 2000
2000 WTA Tour